This was the first edition of the tournament.

Caroline Wozniacki won in the final, defeating Sofia Arvidsson 6–2, 6–1.

Seeds

  Caroline Wozniacki (champion)
  Sofia Arvidsson (final)
  Maria Elena Camerin (quarterfinals)
  Angelique Kerber (semifinals)
  Ekaterina Bychkova (first round)
  Stéphanie Foretz (semifinals)
  Lucie Hradecká (quarterfinals)
  Stefanie Vögele (second round)

Draw

Finals

Top half

Bottom half

Qualifying

Seeds

Qualifiers

Lucky losers

Qualifying draw

First qualifier

Second qualifier

Third qualifier

Fourth qualifier

References 
 http://www.itftennis.com/procircuit/tournaments/women's-tournament/info.aspx?tournamentid=1100018500&event=

2008 ITF Women's Circuit
Tennis in Denmark